The Fifth Conference of the International Woman Suffrage Alliance was held in London, England from April 26 to May 1, 1909. Twenty countries were represented. Representatives from twenty countries attended, with Carrie Chapman Catt presiding. Delegates included Johanna Munter (Denmark), Rosika Schwimmer (Hungary), Dr. Anita Augspurg (Germany), Zinaida Mirovitch (Russia), and Gina Krog (Norway).

The conference is sometimes referred to as the First Quinquennial International Woman Suffrage Alliance Meeting  or the Fourth Conference of the International Woman Suffrage Alliance.

References

Bibliography

External links
Report of the International Woman Suffrage Alliance, Report of Fifth Conference and First Quinquennial, London, England, April 26, 27, 28, 29, 30, May 1, 1909

1909 conferences
1909 in London
Events in London
Women's suffrage
Women's conferences
1909 in women's history
History of women in the United Kingdom
April 1909 events
May 1909 events
Women in London